Nesaku (根折神 – Root Splitter) is kami in Japanese mythology. In many versions he is from the blood of Kagutsuchi. He is a minor star god.  

Nesaku and his brother Iwasaku  are often worshipped in star shrines in northern Kanto.

References 

Japanese mythology
Shinto kami

Stellar gods
Amatsukami